Events from the year 1736 in France.

Incumbents 
Monarch: Louis XV

Events
 
 
 May 26 – Battle of Ackia: British and Chickasaw Native Americans defeat French troops.
 June 19 – French Academy of Sciences expedition led by Pierre Louis Maupertuis, with Anders Celsius, begins work on measuring a meridian arc in Meänmaa of Finland.

Births
 February 19 – Simon Charles Miger, engraver (d. 1828)
 March 21 – Claude Nicolas Ledoux, neoclassical architect (d. 1806)
 June 14 – Charles-Augustin de Coulomb, physicist (d. 1806)
 June 22 – Auguste-Louis de Rossel de Cercy, painter primarily of naval scenes (d. 1804)
 August 26 – Jean-Baptiste L. Romé de l'Isle, geologist (d. 1790)
 September 15 – Jean Sylvain Bailly, astronomer (d. 1793)
 November 30 – Jean-Jacques de Boissieu, painter and etcher (d. 1810)
 Honoré Blanc, gunsmith (d. 1801)

Deaths
 April 2 – Étienne Allegrain, topographical painter (b. 1644)
 April 24 – Prince Eugene of Savoy, French-born Austrian general (b. 1663)
 July 25 – Jean-Baptiste Pater, rococo painter (b. 1695)
 September 26 – Louise Diane d'Orléans, youngest child of Philippe II, Duke of Orleans (b. 1716)
 November 2 – Louis Antoine de Pardaillan de Gondrin, duke (b. 1664)

See also

References

1730s in France